Victoria Azarenka and Max Mirnyi were the defending champions, but Azarenka chose not to participate. Mirnyi partnered with Anna Chakvetadze, but lost in the first round to Nadia Petrova and Jonas Björkman.

Cara Black and Leander Paes won the title, defeating Liezel Huber and Jamie Murray in the final 7–6(8–6), 6–4.

Seeds

Draw

Finals

Top half

Bottom half

External links
Draw
2008 US Open – Doubles draws and results at the International Tennis Federation

Mixed Doubles
US Open (tennis) by year – Mixed doubles